Asemothrips is a genus of thrips in the family Phlaeothripidae.

Species
 Asemothrips combustipes
 Asemothrips fallax
 Asemothrips finlayi
 Asemothrips pallipes
 Asemothrips picturatus

References

Phlaeothripidae
Thrips
Thrips genera